Passing Through may refer to:

 Passing Through (Owen Temple album), 1999
 Passing Through (Randy Travis album), 2004
 "Passing Through", a 1948 folk song written by Dick Blakeslee and recorded by Pete Seeger, The Highwaymen, Cisco Houston, Earl Scruggs, Leonard Cohen (on Live Songs), Valdy, The Waterboys and Kind of Like Spitting.
 "Passing Through", a song by The Walls
 "Passing Through", a song by The Boomtown Rats
 Passing Through (1921 film), American film starring Douglas MacLean
 Passing Through (1977 film), American film
 Passing Through, a 1991 play by Mervyn Thompson

See also
Passin' Thru may refer to:
 Passin' Thru (James Gang album), 1972
 Passin' Thru (Chico Hamilton album), 1962